Donald Matthews may refer to:
 Donald Ray Matthews, U.S. Representative from Florida
 Donald Matthews (political scientist), American political scientist
 Don Matthews, American coach of Canadian football teams